The Game of Change was a college basketball game played between the Loyola Ramblers and the Mississippi State Bulldogs on March 15, 1963, during the second round of the 1963 NCAA University Division basketball tournament, at Jenison Fieldhouse in East Lansing, Michigan. Taking place in the midst of the American civil rights movement, the game between the racially integrated Loyola team and the all-white Mississippi State team is remembered as a milestone in the desegregation of college basketball.

In an era when teams typically played no more than two black players at a time, Loyola had four black starters. Persevering through hate mail and racial slurs hurled by segregationists, Loyola finished the 1962–63 regular season with a dominant 24–2 record. Mississippi State came into the postseason with their fourth Southeastern Conference (SEC) title in five years; however, due to an unwritten law that Mississippi teams would never play against black players, they had never before participated in the NCAA tournament. When university president Dean W. Colvard announced that he would send the team to the tournament, several state officials objected and attempted to restrain the team in the state. Employing a plan involving decoy players, the Bulldogs avoided being served an injunction as they took a charter plane to Michigan the day before the game.

Loyola advanced to the second round after beating Tennessee Tech by 69 points, the largest margin of victory in tournament history, while Mississippi State had a first round bye. The game was preceded by a handshake between Jerry Harkness, a black Loyola player, and Joe Dan Gold, a white Mississippi State player. Loyola won the game 61–51 and ultimately won the entire NCAA tournament with a victory over Cincinnati in the championship game.

Background

Loyola-Chicago

In the early 1960s, college basketball had an unwritten rule that teams should only play two or three black players at a time. For the first decade of his career, Loyola head coach George Ireland had obeyed this rule. In the Ramblers' 1961–62 season, Ireland's starting lineup had three black players (Jerry Harkness, Vic Rouse, and Les Hunter) and two white players (Jack Egan and Mike Gavin). As the season progressed, however, sophomore Ron Miller developed as a guard, and Rouse says several players felt that Miller should have been starting over Gavin. Miller said he was told explicitly by Ireland that he couldn't play him because of the limit of three black players. After falling to Dayton in the semifinal of the 1962 National Invitation Tournament, however, Ireland was "tired of losing", according to Egan. The following night, he violated the unwritten rule for the first time by starting Harkness, Rouse, Hunter, Miller, and Egan in the NIT consolation game.

Loyola performed well with this lineup, and Ireland would go on to use the same five throughout the 1962–63 season. According to Ireland, this stance on black players made him unpopular in the basketball world; he once said that other coaches "used to stand up at banquets and say, 'George Ireland isn't with us tonight because he's in Africa — recruiting.'" This animosity was persistent, and the Loyola players regularly faced discrimination on the road. In January 1962, the Ramblers had planned to stay at Xavier University of Louisiana while traveling to a game against Loyola of New Orleans; however, this plan fell through at the last minute, and the black and white players were forced to find separate lodgings. Chicago news outlets reported on Ireland's outrage at the situation, although some of his players later suggested he played up the controversy. Another incident took place on February 23, 1963, when crowd members at a Houston road game shouted racial slurs and threw popcorn and ice.

Despite these troubles, the Ramblers performed well on the court, and they concluded the regular season with a 24–2 record. They remained in the top five rankings throughout their campaign, and ultimately finished at No. 3 in the AP Poll and No. 4 in the Coaches Poll. On February 18, Loyola was awarded one of eleven at-large bids for the NCAA tournament. In the tournament's first round game on March 11, the Ramblers defeated Tennessee Tech 111–42, the largest margin of victory in tournament history  This led them to face Mississippi State, who'd had a first round bye, in the Mideast regional semifinal on the campus of Michigan State University in East Lansing, Michigan.

Mississippi State

In the late 1950s and early 1960s, head coach Babe McCarthy led the Mississippi State Bulldogs to much success in the Southeastern Conference (SEC). Starting with the 1958–59 season, they won the SEC title four times in five years. The Bulldogs' 1962–63 season was no exception, as they won the SEC title outright with a win over Ole Miss on March 2, and never fell below a No. 11 ranking in either poll for the duration of the season. They finished the season at No. 6 in the AP Poll and No. 7 in the Coaches Poll. They finished the regular season with a 21–5 overall record and a 12–2 record in conference play.

However, the all-white Mississippi State team had limited itself to only competing against other all-white teams. They remained confined to the South for all their regular season games, and had declined NCAA tournament invitations in previous seasons to avoid facing integrated teams. At that time, there existed an "unwritten law" within the state that no Mississippi team would ever play against a team with black players. However, as the civil rights movement was gaining traction around the country, this rule began to face scrutiny and opposition. On February 26, 1963, Mississippi State's student senate voted unanimously to recommend that the Bulldogs accept the tournament invitation, and the following day, they gathered 2,000 student signatures on a resolution to the same effect.

The decision ultimately fell upon Dean W. Colvard, president of Mississippi State University. Colvard was being bombarded with calls, telegrams, and letters from people across the state. Most who contacted him were in favor of playing; of the 389 letters in Mississippi State's archives, 333 were in favor of going to the tournament. On March 2, 1963, Colvard issued a statement announcing that he would be sending the team to the tournament "unless hindered by competent authority".

Colvard's decision sparked widespread debate within the state of Mississippi. Several Mississippi legislators, including State Sen. Billy Mitts, State Rep. Russell Fox, and State Rep. Walter Hester, expressed their disapproval of the decision. In a statement, Hester wrote, "This action follows the Meredith incident as an admission that Miss. State has capitulated and is willing for the Negroes to move into that school en masse," referring to James Meredith's enrollment as the first black student at University of Mississippi after a 1962 riot. State Sen. Sonny Montgomery, on the other hand, indicated his support for Colvard's decision. Sending the team to the tournament was also favored by the players themselves, who unanimously indicated their desire to play when interviewed by The Clarion-Ledger, as well as by the general public, with a locally conducted poll reporting 85% approval.

On March 5, the state college board announced they would be holding a special session to review Colvard's decision. The meeting was convened by trustee M. M. Roberts of Hattiesburg, whom Sports Illustrated describes as a "tenacious lawyer and proud racist". When the board met several days later in Jackson, Mississippi, protesters and petitioners on both sides of the debate were present outside the building. The board voted 8–3 in support of the tournament decision, and 9–2 in a vote expressing confidence in Colvard's leadership.

Nevertheless, participation in the game was still opposed by many in the state, including Gov. Ross R. Barnett. On the afternoon of March 13, State Sens. Billy Mitts and B. W. Lawson obtained an injunction from the Chancery Court of Hinds County forbidding the team from playing in the game. That night, the injunction was reportedly received by the Oktibbeha County deputy sheriff, Dot Johnson. Fearing being stopped by authorities, coach Babe McCarthy left the state early, driving north to Nashville to be joined by the rest of the team later.

On the morning of March 14, the day before the game was to be played, the team sent trainer Dutch Luchsinger and five reserve players to Starkville airport at 8 a.m. as decoys. Had they been stopped by authorities while trying to board, the rest of the team would have taken a private plane to Nashville and flown commercially to Michigan. The Clarion-Ledger reported that Deputy Sheriff Johnson went to the airport to serve the injunction, but left after learning that the plane had not yet arrived due to delays in Atlanta. Other accounts suggest alternate reasons why Johnson failed, such as that he arrived too late because he stopped to finish his coffee first; historian Michael Lenehan sums up the legend of Dot Johnson as "a deputy sheriff who tried to do his duty, but not too hard".

Regardless of why, it is clear that the reserve squad did not encounter the deputy sheriff when they arrived, and thus returned to campus to reunite with the rest of the team. Thirty minutes later, they received word that the plane was en route, and the entire team headed to the airport together. Facing no further obstruction, their plane took off at 9:44 a.m. They stopped over in Nashville to pick up McCarthy before proceeding to the game site in East Lansing, Michigan. Later in the day, a justice of the Supreme Court of Mississippi dissolved the injunction for lacking legal basis.

Game summary

On game night, Jenison Fieldhouse was packed with a reported crowd of 12,143 in the 12,500-capacity gym. The Loyola–Mississippi State matchup was the second half of a doubleheader, following a 7:30 p.m. game between Illinois and Bowling Green. The game was preceded with a handshake between Jerry Harkness, a black Loyola player, and Joe Dan Gold, a white Mississippi State player. In a 2013 interview, Harkness told NPR of the moment: "The flashbulbs just went off unbelievably, and at that time, boy, I knew that this was more than just a game. This was history being made."

Despite the circumstances, the game itself was played without incident. The underdog Mississippi State team started out with a 0–7 lead, holding Loyola scoreless for several minutes. Ron Miller ended the shutout, scoring Loyola's first basket with 14:11 remaining in the half. His teammate Jerry Harkness shortly followed it with two three-point plays to bring the game to a 12–12 tie. By halftime, Loyola led Mississippi State 26–19.

With Vic Rouse and Les Hunter dominating in field goals and rebounds, Loyola stretched their lead to 39–29 with 13:15 left in the second half. However, Mississippi State's offense picked up the slack and narrowed the score to 41–38 with 10:55 remaining. Mississippi State remained competitive in the game until forward Leland Mitchell, their leading scorer and rebounder, fouled out with 6:47 left. Loyola's lead swelled to 57–42, and the Bulldogs were never able to recover. The Ramblers won with a final score of 61–51.

After the game, Loyola coach George Ireland praised Mississippi State as "the most deliberate offense we ran into all year". Bulldogs coach Babe McCarthy attributed Loyola's win to strength in rebounding, and said he thought his team would have had to play "a near perfect game" to beat the Ramblers.

Box score

Aftermath

After defeating Mississippi State, Loyola advanced to the title game with relative ease. On March 16, they defeated Illinois 79–64 in the regional final, and on March 22, they defeated Duke 94–75 in the national semifinal. In the championship game, the Ramblers went to overtime against Cincinnati before ultimately winning by a score of 60–58. It was the first national championship in Loyola-Chicago history, and  it remains the only national championship for the state of Illinois.

The day after the Loyola game, Mississippi State faced Bowling Green in a consolation game. They won 65–60, and returned to Starkville as the third place team from the Mideast region. Upon landing at the airport in Mississippi, they were greeted by a crowd of 700 fans. In 1965, Mississippi State became an integrated campus when Richard Holmes became the first black student to enroll.

Legacy

The 50th anniversary of the Game of Change was marked with a number of commemorative events. On December 15, 2012, Mississippi State visited Loyola for the teams' first meeting since the 1963 tournament. With surviving players from both of the historic teams present, Loyola won by a score of 59–51. On July 10–11, 2013, members of the 1962–63 Loyola team reunited for a two-day trip to Washington, D.C. On the first day, they toured the Capitol Building and met privately with Senator Dick Durbin and House Minority Leader Nancy Pelosi, and on the second day, they met with President Barack Obama in the Oval Office. On November 24, 2013, the 1962–63 Loyola team was inducted into the National Collegiate Basketball Hall of Fame, the first time an entire team was inducted collectively. The team was also inducted into the Chicagoland Sports Hall of Fame on September 18, 2013.

The overall significance of the Game of Change to the civil rights movement has been debated. The 1962–63 Loyola Ramblers are often overlooked, or overshadowed by the 1965–66 Texas Western Miners, who won the 1966 NCAA championship with an all-black starting lineup over an all-white Kentucky team. In a 2018 opinion piece for The Washington Post, Kevin Blackistone argues that the game did not actually bring about much change. Blackistone points to significant setbacks that the movement faced in Mississippi after the game, such as the murder of Vernon Dahmer and the shooting of James Meredith at the March Against Fear, and suggests that the modern narrative of the game is more of an urban legend than a truthful retelling. In a response letter to the editor, journalist Charles Paikert contends that, although the game did not cause sudden major change to ongoing racial tensions in the South, it did show that white athletes and students rejected the unwritten rule against interracial sports competitions. He further writes that the national publicity garnered by Loyola's championship run was a "big deal" in 1963.

References

Further reading

External links

 "Game of Change: The Matchup That Transformed College Basketball" at Loyola University Chicago

1962–63 NCAA University Division men's basketball season
Loyola Ramblers men's basketball
Mississippi State Bulldogs men's basketball
NCAA Division I men's basketball tournament games
March 1963 sports events in the United States
1963 in sports in Michigan
Civil rights movement
Nicknamed sporting events